Kim Da-mi (born April 9, 1995) is a South Korean actress. She is best known for playing the titular role in action-mystery film The Witch: Part 1. The Subversion (2018). She is also known for her roles in the television series Itaewon Class (2020) and Our Beloved Summer (2021-2022).

Career
Kim made her acting debut through the independent film 2017 Project With The Same Name, an omnibus feature film produced annually, playing the role of a woman who was recently involved in a breakup in the episode "Hello, My Hard Work".

In 2018, Kim played the role of a high school student in mystery thriller film Marionette.  The same year, she played the lead role of Koo Ja-yoon in the action-mystery film The Witch: Part 1. The Subversion, directed by Park Hoon-jung, where she was chosen from among 1,500 candidates who auditioned for the role. She received universal acclaim for her strong performance in a challenging role that included intense fighting scenes, and winning a large number of newcomer awards. Thanks to the success and popularity of The Witch: Part 1. The Subversion, a sequel is scheduled to be produced.

In 2020, Kim made her television debut in the JTBC television series Itaewon Class, based on the webtoon of the same title. For her performance in the drama, she won the Best New Actress (TV) Award at 56th Baeksang Arts Awards.

In March 2021, Kim was confirmed to join the SBS drama Our Beloved Summer with Choi Woo-shik, which premiered in December 2021. The drama reunited Kim with Choi after The Witch: Part 1. The Subversion (2018).

In May 2022, Kim decided not to renew her contract with ANDMARQ. Later in August 2022, Kim signed with United Artists Agency.

Filmography

Film

Television series

Television show

Music video appearances

Awards and nominations

References

External links

 
 
Kim Da-mi on Instagram

Living people
People from Seoul
Actresses from Seoul
South Korean film actresses
21st-century South Korean actresses
1995 births
Incheon National University alumni
Best New Actress Paeksang Arts Award (television) winners